Nitromersol (metaphen) is a mercury-containing organic compound that is primarily used as an antiseptic and disinfectant. It is a brown-yellow solid that has no odor or taste, does not irritate the skin or mucous membranes, and has no impact on rubber or metallic instruments, including surgical and dental tools. 

This compound is a confirmed animal carcinogen. It can emit toxic fumes of NOx and mercury vapor when heated. In 1998, use of nitromersol (and other mercury-containing products) as OTC first-aid antiseptics and products for diaper rash and vaginal contraceptives was disallowed by the FDA. Nitromersol can cause hypersensitivity reactions. 

It is still in use as a preservative for vaccines and antitoxins.

See also
 
 Phenylmercuric nitrate - an organomercury compound with powerful antiseptic and antifungal effects

References

Antiseptics
Disinfectants
Organomercury compounds